KTUP may refer to:

 KTUP (FM), a radio station (98.3 FM) licensed to serve Dallas, Oregon, United States
 Tupelo Regional Airport